Coleophora pseudopoecilella is a moth of the family Coleophoridae. It is found on the Canary Islands (Tenerife, Fuerteventura).

The larvae feed on Patellifolia procumbens and Salsola oppositifolia. They create a composite leaf case, which is three-valved and has a mouth angle of 30-40°. Cases on Patellifolia are reddish brown and about 13 mm long, while those on Salsola are dark greyish brown and 15–16 mm.

References

pseudolinosyris
Moths of Africa
Moths described in 1982